"Rock 'n' Roll High School" is a song by American punk rock band Ramones, from the soundtrack album Rock 'n' Roll High School. The single did not chart in the U.S. but peaked at number 67 on the UK Singles Chart.

There are three versions of the song. The first was recorded in early 1979 by Ed Stasium and was intended for the Rock 'n' Roll High School soundtrack. This version opens with an extended drum beat first, with Joey eventually singing the opening line, "Rock, Rock, Rock, Rock, Rock 'n' Roll High School." This is also the version they usually performed live. This version was not issued until the 1988 compilation album Ramones Mania.

The second version is a slight remix of the Ed Stasium version by producer Phil Spector, who would go on to produce The Ramones' next album, End of the Century. This version features Spector's Wall of Sound mixing technique and was the version featured on the Rock 'n' Roll High School soundtrack album and accompanying 7" single.

The third version is a complete re-recording by Phil Spector for the End of the Century album. This version opens with a long, sustained guitar chord and has a slightly different arrangement. This version was also featured in the music video for the song.

In the music video, drummer Marky Ramone, dressed in drag, plays the role of the female teacher. Also three of the band members' girlfriends/wives can be seen; Dee Dee's first wife Vera Boldis, Johnny's then-girlfriend Roxy and Joey's then-girlfriend (who later became involved with and married bandmate Johnny), Linda Ramone. The only time the Spector-produced version was played was on The Sha Na Na Show, where the band mimed the song.

The Ramones performed the song on the BBC2 television show The Old Grey Whistle Test in 1980.

Charts

Weekly charts

Year-end charts

References

Film theme songs
1979 singles
1979 songs
Ramones songs
Songs written by Johnny Ramone
Songs written by Dee Dee Ramone
Songs written by Joey Ramone
Song recordings produced by Ed Stasium
Songs about rock music
Songs about school
Songs written for films
Song recordings with Wall of Sound arrangements